The 1990 Australian Open was a tennis tournament played on outdoor hard courts at Flinders Park in Melbourne in Victoria in Australia. It was the 78th edition of the Australian Open and was held from 15 through 28 January 1990.

Seniors

Men's singles

 Ivan Lendl defeated  Stefan Edberg 4–6, 7–6(7–3), 5–2 (Edberg retired)
 It was Lendl's 8th and last career Grand Slam title and his 2nd Australian Open title.

Women's singles

 Steffi Graf defeated  Mary Joe Fernández 6–3, 6–4
 It was Graf's 9th career Grand Slam title and her 3rd Australian Open title.

Men's doubles

 Pieter Aldrich /  Danie Visser defeated  Grant Connell /  Glenn Michibata 6–4, 4–6, 6–1, 6–4
 It was Aldrich's 1st career Grand Slam title and his only Australian Open title. It was Visser's 1st career Grand Slam title and his 1st Australian Open title.

Women's doubles

 Jana Novotná /  Helena Suková defeated  Patty Fendick /  Mary Joe Fernández 7–6(7–5), 7–6(8–6)
 It was Novotná's 6th career Grand Slam title and her 3rd Australian Open title. It was Suková's 4th career Grand Slam title and her 1st Australian Open title.

Mixed doubles

 Natasha Zvereva /  Jim Pugh defeated  Zina Garrison /  Rick Leach 4–6, 6–2, 6–3
 It was Zvereva's 2nd career Grand Slam title and her 1st Australian Open title. It was Pugh's 7th career Grand Slam title and his 5th and last Australian Open title.

Juniors

Boys' singles

 Dirk Dier defeated  Leander Paes 6–4, 7–6

Girls' singles

 Magdalena Maleeva defeated  Louise Stacey 7–5, 6–7, 6–1

Boys' doubles

 Roger Pettersson /  Mårten Renström defeated  Robert Janecek /  Ernesto Munoz de Cote 4–6, 7–6, 6–1

Girls' doubles

 Rona Mayer /  Limor Zaltz defeated  Justine Hodder /  Nicole Pratt 6–4, 6–4

Prize money

References

External links
 Australian Open official website

 
 

 
1990 in Australian tennis
January 1990 sports events in Australia
1990,Australian Open